1X1=1 (To Be One) is the debut extended play by South Korean boy group Wanna One, a project group created through the 2017 Mnet survival show, Produce 101 Season 2, composed of eleven trainees from different entertainment companies that will promote for 18 months under YMC Entertainment. The album was released digitally and physically on August 7, 2017, by YMC Entertainment, Stone Music Entertainment and CJ E&M Music. A Japanese version of the album was released on September 27, 2017, through Pony Canyon. The album was re-released under the title 1-1=0 (Nothing Without You) on November 13, 2017.

Background and release
On June 16, 2017, the finalists in survival show Produce 101 Season 2 were revealed and the group immediately started preparations for their debut, starting with recording their own version of the song "It's Me (Pick Me)", "Always" (which was first released as final song for Top 20 finalists), and "Never". In addition, there are also 4 new songs to the album. Among these new songs, "Energetic" a song produced by Pentagon's Hui, which also composed "Never"; and "Burn It Up" were considered for the title track which would be decided by public votes. The album also included a fan-tribute pop song, titled  "Wanna Be (My Baby)".

On September 28, 2017, YMC started releasing teasers of the repackaged edition of the album, titled 1-1=0 (Nothing Without You). The repackage serves as a prequel to their first album. In contrast to the energetic and passionate side of the group shown in their first release, Nothing Without You would showcase the members' apprehension about an uncertain future as well as aspiration they had as trainees just months before and "hopes for beautiful days ahead". It was released on November 13, 2017, with four new tracks: the lead single “Beautiful", "Wanna", a funky EDM ballad, “Twilight”, a bubbly dance track and “Nothing Without You”, the album's harmony-laden intro.

Promotion
Prior to their debut, the group began promotions through their reality show Wanna One Go, which premiered on August 7, 2017, on the cable channel Mnet. During the first episode of Wanna One Go!, it was revealed that "Energetic" won the public vote and will become the title track of the album.

Wanna One held their debut showcase and a small concert on August 7 at Gocheok Sky Dome, which opened to 20,000 attendees. The group had their first music show performance on Mnet's M! Countdown on August 10, 2017. They won their first music trophy on MBC Music's Show! Champion on August 16. The group wrapped up promotions with the August 30 airing of Show! Champion, with 15 music show trophies for "Energetic", making it the winningest K-pop debut song since Seo Taiji and Boys - a record it still holds as of May 2022.

The second season of Wanna One Go!, titled Wanna One Go: Zero Base, aired its first episode on November 3, 2017, prior to the group's repackage release. Wanna One held a comeback show for their repackaged album, which was broadcast live on Mnet and tvN on November 13. It showcases the group's performances of their new songs as well as the stories behind the creation of the new album. Their first comeback stage took place on November 17 on KBS' Music Bank. The group received their first win for "Beautiful" on MBC Music's Show Champion on November 22.

Commercial performance

1X1=1 (To Be One)
The album reached 600,000 preorder copies prior to its release, making it the debut K-pop album with the highest number of pre-orders.

To Be One debuted at No. 3 on Billboard's World Albums chart and earned first-place rankings on iTunes Top Albums chart in 11 countries. It topped Gaon's Monthly Album chart for the month of August, selling over 704,000 copies. As of October 2021, it has sold 805,000 copies, still holding the record for the best selling debut album for a K-pop group since Seo Taiji and Boys.

The title song, "Energetic" topped six online music charts of six major music sites: Melon, Genie, Bugs, Mnet, Naver and Soribada; and achieved a real-time "all-kill" status. The other album tracks also secured spots within the Top 10 positions.

1-1=0 (Nothing Without You)
On October 30, 2017, YMC announced that the number of preorders for the repackaged album has reached more than 500,000 copies. With the combined sales of their first album and its repackaged edition, Wanna One became only the third Korean group to sell a million copies of their debut album, and the first since Seo Taiji and Boys did so with their eponymous debut in 1992.

The title track, "Beautiful" charted atop on real-time charts of six music sites: Melon, Genie, Bugs, Mnet, Naver, and Soribada upon its release. In addition, three other new tracks of the album placed in the top 10 of all six charts.

Track listing

Charts

Weekly

Monthly

Sales

Awards and nominations

Mnet Asian Music Awards

|-
| 2017
| 1X1=1 (To Be One)
| Album of the Year
|

Gaon Chart Music Awards

|-
| rowspan="3"|2018
| 1X1=1 (To Be One) 
| Album of the Year – 3rd Quarter
|
|-
|  1-1=0 (Nothing Without You)
| Album of the Year – 4th Quarter
|
|-
| 1X1=1 (To Be One)
| New Artist of the Year (Album)
|
|-
|}

MBC Plus X Genie Music Awards

|-
|2018
|  1-1=0 (Nothing Without You)
|Digital Album of the Year
|
|}

Korea Popular Music Awards

|-
| 2018
| 1-1=0 (Nothing Without You)
| Best Album
|

Notes

References

2017 debut EPs
Korean-language EPs
YMC Entertainment EPs
Wanna One albums
Albums produced by Hui (singer)